Ayr was a royal burgh that returned one commissioner to the Parliament of Scotland and to the Convention of Estates.

After the Acts of Union 1707, Ayr, Campbeltown, Inveraray, Irvine and Rothesay formed the Ayr district of burghs, returning one member between them to the House of Commons of Great Britain.

List of burgh commissioners

 1567, 1575, 1578, 1579: John Lockhart of Barr
 1604, 1605, 1607, 1609, 1612: John Lockhart of Barr
 1644: John Osbourn  
 1645–47, 1648, 1649: John Kennedy 
 1649, 1650–51: Hew Kennedy 
 1661–63, 1665 convention, 1667 convention, 1669–74: William Cunningham, provost 
 1678 convention: Robert Doock, provost 
 1681–82: James Boyll, provost 
 1685–86: Robert Hunter, provost 
 1689 (convention), 1689–1702, 1703–07: John Moore, provost

References

See also
 List of constituencies in the Parliament of Scotland at the time of the Union

Constituencies of the Parliament of Scotland (to 1707)
Constituencies disestablished in 1707
1707 disestablishments in Scotland
Politics of South Ayrshire
History of South Ayrshire
Ayr